Shaping Up is the tenth and final studio album by Australian band, The Sherbs. It was released in November 1982 and peaked at number 76 on the Kent Music Report.

Track listing
 Side A
"Shaping Up"
"No Holding Back (The Feeling)"
"Don't Throw It All Away"
"(I'll) Take It on the Run"

 Side B
"The Arrow"
"Wild Is the Sea"
"I Don't Wanna Lose You"
"Knowing You" (Bonus track on cassette release)

Charts

References

Sherbet (band) albums
1982 albums